Edon Pruti (born 8 April 2002) is a professional footballer who plays as a central defender for  club Hartlepool United. Born in England, he has represented Albania at youth level.

Pruti is a product of the Stevenage and Burnley academies and began his senior career in non-League football with Hanwell Town and Slough Town. Pruti transferred to Brentford in 2022 and following a four-month spell, he transferred to Hartlepool United in 2023.

Club career

Youth years 
A central defender, Pruti began his career in Sunday league football. Following a spell in the Stevenage academy, he signed a two-year scholarship with the Burnley academy at the end of the 2017–18 season. Prior to the cancellation of the 2019–20 season due to the COVID-19 pandemic, Pruti played the first senior football of his career away on loan at North West Counties League First Division South club Abbey Hey. Pruti sign a three-month extension to his scholarship in June 2020, but was released when it expired in September 2020.

Non-League football 

Late in the COVID-19-affected 2020–21 season, Pruti made cup appearances for Isthmian League South Central Division club Hanwell Town. He was a part of the club's Middlesex Senior Cup-winning squad and played, scored and was named man of the match in the 1–0 victory over Harefield United in the Final. Pruti remained with the club and made 10 appearances, scoring one goal, during the first half of the 2021–22 season. He transferred to National League South club Slough Town in January 2022 and made 9 appearances and scored one goal during the remainder of the 2021–22 season. Following three appearances during the opening month of the 2022–23 season, Pruti departed Arbour Park.

Brentford 
On 31 August 2022, Pruti joined the B team at Premier League club Brentford on a one-year contract, with the option of a further year, for an undisclosed fee. He had played for the team on trial early in the 2021–22 season. Following 14 appearances and one goal, Pruti transferred out of the club in January 2023.

Hartlepool United 
On 13 January 2023, Pruti signed a contract with League Two club Hartlepool United, with terms undisclosed.

International career 
Pruti was capped by Albania at U18 and U19 level. He was called into a Bosnia and Herzegovina U18 training camp in January 2020, but did not participate.

Personal life 
Pruti was born at the Chelsea and Westminster Hospital to a mother from Kosovo and a father from Bosnia and Herzegovina. He was brought up in Ladbroke Grove.

Career statistics

Honours 
Hanwell Town

 Middlesex Senior Cup: 2020–21

References

External links

Edon Pruti at hartlepoolunited.co.uk

Living people
Brentford F.C. players
2002 births
Albania youth international footballers
National League (English football) players
Loughborough University F.C. players
United Counties League players
Association football central defenders
Hanwell Town F.C. players
Slough Town F.C. players
Isthmian League players
Abbey Hey F.C. players
North West Counties Football League players
People from Chelsea, London
Sportspeople from London
Hartlepool United F.C. players
English Football League players